Heartbreak Hotel is a song performed by Swedish singer Yohio. The song made it to the Melodifestivalen 2013 final and could have become Sweden's entry at the Eurovision Song Contest 2013 in Malmö, Sweden. The song is written and produced by Johan Fransson, Tobias Lundgren, Tim Larsson, Henrik Göranson and Yohio himself.

Music video
Yohio taped the music video for "Heartbreak Hotel" in Tokyo, Japan.

Charts

References

2013 singles
2013 songs
Songs written by Tobias Lundgren
Songs written by Tim Larsson
Songs written by Johan Fransson (songwriter)
Melodifestivalen songs of 2013
Yohio songs
Universal Music Group singles